Hans Betz (born 14 June 1931) is a German rower. He competed in the men's eight event at the 1952 Summer Olympics.

References

1931 births
Living people
German male rowers
Olympic rowers of Germany
Rowers at the 1952 Summer Olympics
Rowers from Cologne